Chalermwoot Sa-ngapol (Thai เฉลิมวุฒิ สง่าพล) (born October 2, 1958) is a Thai football manager and former player for the Thailand national team. He was the midfielder who  has been described as the "Glenn Hoddle of Thai football" with his precise passing and from open play and set pieces. He scored 18 goals for the national team.

Chalermwoot was elect as one of the all star players of the AFC In 1986. After he retired from the footballer in 1990, he adjust his job to the head coach of the Bangkok Bank FC in 1999.

Honours

Manager
Bangkok Bank F.C.
 Thai FA Cup: 1999
 Queen's Cup: 2000
 Asian Cup Winners' Cup 3rd Place: 1999–2000

Thailand U19
 AFF U-19 Youth Championship : 2009

International goals

References 

1958 births
Living people
Chalermwoot Sa-ngapol
Chalermwoot Sa-ngapol
Chalermwoot Sa-ngapol
Association football midfielders
Chalermwoot Sa-ngapol
Chalermwoot Sa-ngapol
Chalermwoot Sa-ngapol
Pattaya United F.C. managers
Chalermwoot Sa-ngapol
Chalermwoot Sa-ngapol
Chalermwoot Sa-ngapol
Chalermwoot Sa-ngapol
Chalermwoot Sa-ngapol
Chalermwoot Sa-ngapol
Southeast Asian Games medalists in football
Chalermwoot Sa-ngapol
Competitors at the 1985 Southeast Asian Games